Jackson Township is an inactive township in St. Clair County, Missouri, United States.

Jackson Township was erected in 1841, taking its name from President Andrew Jackson.

References

Townships in Missouri
Townships in St. Clair County, Missouri